Khankh is a sum of Khövsgöl aimag. In 2000, the sum had a population of 2,140 inhabitants.

History
The Khankh sum was founded, together with the whole Khövsgöl aimag, in 1931. In 1933, it had about 1,000 inhabitants in 346 households, and about 13,200 heads of livestock. In 1955, the sum was dissolved, some parts were joined to Chandmani-Öndör, the rest became Turt khoroo. In 1959, the sum was reestablished, but became part of Renchinlkhümbe in 1978. In 1994, it was reestablished again. In 1956, the local Khövsgöl Dolgio negdel was founded.

Geography
The sum borders Lake Khövsgöl. The aimags highest mountain, Mönkhsaridag, is located at the border to Russia.

Economy
In 2004, there were roughly 26,000 heads of livestock, among them 6,600 sheep, 7,500 goats, 8,900 cattle and yaks, 2,600 horses, and 6 camels. In 2000, the sum center was connected to the Russian power grid.

Literature
M.Nyamaa, Khövsgöl aimgiin lavlakh toli, Ulaanbaatar 2001, p. 156f

References

Districts of Khövsgöl Province